Gábor Csapó (20 September 1950 – 27 November 2022) was a Hungarian water polo player who competed in the 1976 Summer Olympics and in the 1980 Summer Olympics. He died from respiratory failure on 27 November 2022, at the age of 72.

See also
 Hungary men's Olympic water polo team records and statistics
 List of Olympic champions in men's water polo
 List of Olympic medalists in water polo (men)
 List of world champions in men's water polo
 List of World Aquatics Championships medalists in water polo

References

External links
 

1950 births
2022 deaths
Hungarian male water polo players
Olympic water polo players of Hungary
Water polo players at the 1976 Summer Olympics
Water polo players at the 1980 Summer Olympics
Olympic gold medalists for Hungary
Olympic bronze medalists for Hungary
Olympic medalists in water polo
Medalists at the 1980 Summer Olympics
Medalists at the 1976 Summer Olympics
World Aquatics Championships medalists in water polo